The FC Basel 1901–02 season was the ninth season in their existence. It was the third season that they played for the Swiss championship in the Series A. The club's chairman was Emanuel Schiess. This was his second period as the club's chairman. In this season Basel played their home games in a new location, next to the Thiersteinerallee, in the Gundeldingen neighborhood in the south-eastern part of the municipality of Basel.

Overview

Football ground 
During the early years of the football sport, an adequate field that could be used as a football pitch was the biggest problem for all clubs. Straight after the club's foundation, she made the Landhof available, free of charge for the first few years, as a playing surface. From 1895 to 1901 the Vélodrome de Bâle, a cycle track, was also located around the grounds. As the Vélodrome club dissolved a new tenant was found and at the start of the 1901–02 season a new football ground had to be found, because the new tenants had built a concrete bowling lane right across the middle of the football pitch.

The club tried and tested the FC Excelsior grounds and the sport grounds next to St. Paul's Church, but to no avail. They eventually found a space in the Thiersteinerallee, right next to the pitch that local rivals BSC Old Boys were using. The Landhof was to the north of the river Rhine and the Thiersteinerallee about eight kilometers south. The move from the former field to the new field was made late in the evening, the heavy goal posts and crossbars being carried manually across the town in the dark, so that no one would notice that the club was lacking money. This new pitch was used for one and a half years until the concrete bowling alley was eventually removed.

Football season 
Alphonse Schorpp was the team captain for the third successive season and as captain he led the team trainings and was responsible for the line-ups. Basel played two pre-season friendlies and two during the mid-season. During the winter break and again at the end of the season the team travelled twice to France to play Mulhouse. Both games ended with a victory. Of the total 11 friendlies that the team played that season seven were won and four ended with a defeat.

Basel played two friendly games against FC Gymnasia 1900, a team that had been newly founded in February 1900 by young players from the upper gymnasium, who united to form a football team. The team was attempting to join the Swiss Football Association. (In January 1904 the club dissolved and merged with Old Boys). 

By the end of the previous season 15 clubs with more than 1,000 members had joined the Swiss Football Association. Most of the clubs had two or three teams, therefore the third tier of Swiss football was introduced called Serie C. From a local point of view this meant the following: Serie A with Basel, Old Boys, Fortuna Basel and Excelsior Basel. Serie B with Old Boys II, Basel II und Excelsior Basel II. Serie C with Columbia Basel, Fortuna Basel II, Gymnasia Basel and Nordstern Basel.

The Swiss Serie A season 1901–02 was divided into three regional groups. There were five teams in the east group, five in the central and four in the west group. Basel were allocated to the central group together with the Young Boys Bern and the afore mentioned three other teams from Basel. Although Fortuna had been relegated the previous season, their reserve team had been Serie B champions and achieved promotion. Excelsior were disqualified  from the Serie A by the Swiss Football Association (ASF-SFV) in the mid-season. The reason was, they had illegally poached players from local rivals FC Fortuna Basel. The already achieved sporting results were retained in the league table, the missing games were not awarded. FC Basel completed the central division with seven games, five victories and two defeats with ten points, but were one point behind YB who qualified for the finals.

From the west group FC Bern and from the east group FC Zürich also qualified for the championship play-off. FCZ won the championship.

Players

Results 

Legend

Friendly matches

Pre-and mid-season

Winter break to end of season

Serie A

Central group matches

Group central league table

See also
 History of FC Basel
 List of FC Basel players
 List of FC Basel seasons

Notes

Footnotes 

Incomplete league matches 1901–1902 season: FCB-OB, Excelsior-FCB, FCB-Fortuna

References

Sources 
 Rotblau: Jahrbuch Saison 2014/2015. Publisher: FC Basel Marketing AG. 
 Die ersten 125 Jahre. Publisher: Josef Zindel im Friedrich Reinhardt Verlag, Basel. 
 Switzerland 1901-02 at RSSSF
(NB: Despite all efforts, the editors of these books and the authors in "Basler Fussballarchiv" have failed to be able to identify all the players, their date and place of birth or date and place of death, who played in the games during the early years of FC Basel. Most of the documentation for this season is missing.)

External links
 FC Basel official site

FC Basel seasons
Basel